Mark Dempsey may refer to:
Mark Dempsey (English footballer) (born 1964), English coach and former footballer
Mark Dempsey (Irish footballer) (born 1972), Irish association football player
Mark Dempsey (baseball) (born 1957), former Major League Baseball pitcher